Vietalva Parish is an administrative unit of Aizkraukle Municipality in the Vidzeme region of Latvia.

Towns, villages and settlements of Vietalva Parish 
Alūnēni 
Benckalni
Bites 
Jaunāmuiža
Kaivēni 
Odziena 
Vietalva

Parishes of Latvia
Aizkraukle Municipality
Vidzeme